Achalinus spinalis, commonly known as Peters' odd-scaled snake, the Japanese odd-scaled snake, the Japanese ground snake or the grey burrowing snake, is a species of snake in the family Xenodermatidae.

The species is found in northern Vietnam, Japan (Kyūshū, Honshū, the Ryukyu Islands, Koshiki, Tokuno-shima: Kametoku and Inokawa), and central China (east to Fujian, west to Yunnan and Sichuan, and north to Gansu and Shaanxi, and in Zhejiang, Jiangxi, Jiangsu and Hubei) at an elevation of 1,230 m.

References

Xenodermidae
Reptiles of Japan
Reptiles of China
Reptiles of Vietnam
Snakes of Vietnam
Snakes of Asia
Reptiles described in 1869
Taxa named by Wilhelm Peters